Broeck Pointe is a home rule-class city in Jefferson County, Kentucky, United States. The population was 272 at the 2010 census.

Geography
Broeck Pointe is located in northeastern Jefferson County at  (38.295367, -85.586562). It is bordered to the west by Goose Creek, to the northwest by Barbourmeade, to the north by Manor Creek, to the east by Ten Broeck, and to the south by a portion of Louisville.

Demographics

As of the census of 2000, there were 294 people, 96 households, and 88 families residing in the city. The racial makeup of the city was 94.90% White, 3.06% Black or African American and 2.04% Asian. Hispanic or Latino of any race were 1.02% of the population.

There were 96 households, out of which 43.8% had children under the age of 18 living with them, 86.5% were married couples living together, 5.2% had a female householder with no husband present, and 8.3% were non-families. 8.3% of all households were made up of individuals, and 4.2% had someone living alone who was 65 years of age or older. The average household size was 3.06 and the average family size was 3.25.

In the city, the population was spread out, with 28.2% under the age of 18, 6.5% from 18 to 24, 22.8% from 25 to 44, 35.0% from 45 to 64, and 7.5% who were 65 years of age or older. The median age was 41 years. For every 100 females, there were 94.7 males. For every 100 females age 18 and over, there were 88.4 males.

The median income for a household in the city was $103,106, and the median income for a family was $106,592. Males had a median income of $65,938 versus $39,167 for females. The per capita income for the city was $35,297. About 2.3% of families and 2.8% of the population were below the poverty line, including 5.1% of those under the age of eighteen and none of those 65 or over.

References

.

Cities in Kentucky
Cities in Jefferson County, Kentucky
Louisville metropolitan area
Populated places established in 1980